Bruce Welch  (born 2 November 1941 as Bruce Cripps) is an English guitarist, songwriter, producer, singer and businessman best known as a founding member of the Shadows.

Biography
Welch's parents (Stan Cripps and Grace Welch) moved him to 15 Broadwood View, Chester-le-Street, County Durham. Welch's mother died when he was aged six, and he grew up with his Aunt Sadie. After learning to play the guitar, he formed a Tyneside skiffle band called the Railroaders when he was fourteen. His Rutherford Grammar School friend Brian Rankin (later to be known as Hank Marvin) joined the group, and they travelled to London in 1958 for the final of a talent competition. Although they did not win, they joined with members of other entrant bands and formed the Five Chesternuts with Pete Chester (born 1942), son of comedian Charlie Chester, on drums.

Upon moving to London, Bruce Welch and Hank Marvin briefly operated as the Geordie Boys before enlisting in an outfit called the Drifters.

In September 1958, Welch and Marvin joined the Drifters, later to become the Shadows, as Cliff Richard's backing band. As well as success with the Shadows, Welch acted as producer for (among others) Richard and songwriter for his ex-fiancée, Olivia Newton-John. He also released a solo single, "Please Mr. Please", which was not commercially successful, though the song has been covered by several recording artists (most notably Newton-John, who would take it into the top 10 of the US pop and country charts in 1975).

Welch wrote several number 1 hit singles for Richard and for the Shadows. Among tunes or songs written or co-written by Welch are the Shadows' hits "Foot Tapper", "Theme for Young Lovers",  and "The Rise and Fall of Flingel Bunt", Marvin Welch & Farrar's "Faithful" and "My Home Town", and Cliff Richard hits "Please Don't Tease", "In the Country", "Summer Holiday", "I Love You" and "I Could Easily Fall (In Love with You)".

He was the musical consultant for the West End musical Buddy – The Buddy Holly Story.

After the Shadows disbanded in 1990, with Marvin deciding to tour with his own band, Welch's plans for his own tours did not fully materialise until 1998, when he formed Bruce Welch's Shadows (originally called 'Bruce Welch's Moonlight Shadows' – a name that was dropped after 1998). The group featured former Shadows bassist Alan Jones and keyboardist Cliff Hall, with Bob Watkins on drums. Phil Kelly and Barry Gibson (owner of Burns Guitars) shared lead guitar duties until Gibson's departure in 2000. Daniel Martin replaced Phil Kelly for the 2012 Shadowmania.

Shadowmania

In 1998, he produced Shadowmania, a one-day show comprising various Shadows tribute bands, with his own band topping the bill. Due to the event's success he presented it annually until 2012, missing only 2004 and 2009 due to tours with the reformed Shadows.  
 
At Shadowmania 2011 he included a 'Tribute to Jet Harris', his former band member who had died from cancer in March of that year. At Shadowmania 2012, Phil Kelly could not appear because of illness and was replaced by session guitarist-songwriter Daniel Martin, and Justin Daish, leader of The Shadowers (Jet Harris' final backing band).

Honours 
He was appointed OBE (Officer of the Order of the British Empire) in the 2004 Birthday Honours list for services to music.

Personal life
Welch lives in Richmond, London.

Early career groups (before Shadows and Drifters)
1956–57 – The Railroaders (No. 1)
 Hank Marvin (guitar), Bruce Welch (guitar), George Williams (guitar) and Jim ? (drums)

1956–57 – The Railroaders (No. 2)
 Hank Marvin (guitar), Bruce Welch (guitar), Eddie Silver (guitar), George Williams (bass) and Jim ? (drums)

1958 – The Five Chesternuts
 7-inch single – "Jean Dorothy"/"Teenage Love" – on Columbia
 Gerry Hurst (vocals), Hank Marvin (guitar), Bruce Welch (guitar), Neil Johnson (bass) and Pete Chester (drums)

Groups
 The Railroaders
 The Five Chesternuts
 The Drifters
 Cliff Richard and the Drifters
 The Shadows
 Cliff Richard and the Shadows
 Marvin, Welch & Farrar
 Bruce Welch's Shadows

Discography
 "Please Mr Please"/"Song of Yesterday" – EMI 2141 – 7-inch – 1974.
 Marvin Welch and Farrar – Marvin Welch and Farrar – Regal Zonophone – 1971.
 Marvin Welch and Farrar – Second Opinion – Regal Zonophone 1971.
 The Five Chesternuts – "Jean Dorothy" – Columbia – 7-inch – 1958.
 The Shadows – The Shadows discography

Guest vocals
 Marvin and Farrar – Hank Marvin and John Farrar – EMI – LP/CD – 1973.

Production credits
 Cliff Richard – "We Don't Talk Anymore" – 7-inch and 12-inch (extended mix) – EMI – 1979.
 Cliff Richard – I'm Nearly Famous – LP/CD – EMI – 1975.
 Cliff Richard – Every Face Tells a Story – LP/CD – EMI – 1976.
 Cliff Richard – Green Light – LP/CD – EMI – 1978.
 Cliff Richard – "Little Mistreater" on album The Album – LP/CD – EMI – 1992.
 The Shadows – XXV – LP/CD – Polydor – 1983.
 Tarney / Spencer Band – "Cathy's Clown" – 7-inch – A&M – 1979.
 Roger Whittaker – The Genius of Love – LP/CD – 1986.
 Olivia Newton-John – If Not For You – LP/CD – Pye – 1971.
 Olivia Newton-John – Olivia – LP/CD – Pye – 1972.
 Charlie Dore – Where to Now – LP/CD – Island/Lemon – 1979.
 Cilla Black – Especially for You – LP/CD – Ktel/Hallmark – 1980.
 Alan David – Alan David – LP – EMI/EMC3365 – 1981.
 Alan Davy – [unreleased album] – 1981.
 Sutherland Brothers and Quiver – Down to Earth – LP/CD – CBS/Lemon – 1977/.
 Page Three – "Hold on to Love" – 7-inch – WB.
 McArthur Park – "Taffeta Rose" / "Sammy" – Columbia – 7-inch.

Bibliography
Books
 J. Harris, R. Ellis and C. Richard, Driftin' with Cliff Richard (London, 1959).
 The Shadows by Themselves by Royston Ellis with the Shadows. Consul Books. 1961. No ISBN
 
 
 "That Sound" (From Move It On: The Story of the Magic Sound of the Shadows), by R. Pistolesi, M. Addey & M. Mazzini. Publ: Vanni Lisanti. June 2000. No ISBN
 A Pocket Guide to Shadow Music, by M. Campbell, R. Bradford, L. Woosey. Idmon. 
 
 The Shadows at Polydor, by M.Campbell. Idmon. 
 
 
 17 Watts: First 20 Years of British Rock Guitar, the Musicians and Their Stories, by Mo Foster, Sanctuary Music Library,  
 The Shadows Discography, by John Friesen. No ISBN
 The Shadows Discography, by George Geddes. No ISBN
 
 
 John Farrar—Music Makes my Day, (A Shadsfax-Tribute-40pp-booklet), by T. Hoffman, A. Hardwick, S. Duffy, G. Jermy, A. Lewis, J. Auman. No ISBN
 John Rostill—Funny Old World, (Tribute-60pp-booklet), by B. Bradford. No ISBN

References

External links

Interview with Bruce Welch in International Songwriters Association's "Songwriter Magazine"

Living people
1941 births
English male guitarists
English male singers
English record producers
English rock guitarists
English songwriters
Officers of the Order of the British Empire
People from Bognor Regis
Rhythm guitarists
The Shadows members
Skiffle musicians